Marti Roca de Torres is a professional poker player who won a World Series of Poker bracelet in the 2017 World Series of Poker Europe main event. He was born in Barcelona and lived in Mataró at the time of his first bracelet. He is a former economics teacher.

World Series of Poker

An "E" following a year denotes bracelet(s) won at the World Series of Poker Europe

Notes

External links
Marti Roca de Torres at Hendonmob.com

Spanish poker players
World Series of Poker bracelet winners
Living people
People from Barcelona
People from Mataró
Sportspeople from the Province of Barcelona
Year of birth missing (living people)